Boulenophrys huangshanensis is a species of frog in the family Megophryidae.
It is endemic to the Huangshan mountains (its type locality) in southern Anhui province, China.
Its natural habitats are temperate forests and rivers.
It is threatened by habitat loss.

References

huangshanensis
Amphibians of China
Endemic fauna of China
Taxonomy articles created by Polbot
Amphibians described in 2005